Naach Uthe Sansaar is a 1976 Bollywood romance film directed by Yakub Hasan Rizvi.

Cast 
Shashi Kapoor as Karmu
Hema Malini as Nanki Mehto
Simi Garewal as Somu
Aruna Irani as Nital
Roopesh Kumar as Johny
Chandrima Bhaduri as Mrs. Mehto
Rajan Haksar as Catholic Priest
Leela Mishra as Karmu's Mother
Rajendra Nath as Trithu
Bhushan Tiwari as Vaidraj Mehto
Ramayan Tiwari as Jaggu Mehto

Production 
Naach Uthe Sansaar was in the making for six years.

Soundtrack

References

External links 
 

1976 films
1970s Hindi-language films
1970s romance films
Films scored by Laxmikant–Pyarelal
Indian romance films
Hindi-language romance films